Mount Ephraim is an unincorporated community in Noble County, Ohio, United States.

History
Mount Ephraim was platted in 1838 by Ephraim Vorhies, and named for him. A post office was established at Mount Ephraim in 1843, and remained in operation until 1955.

Notes

Unincorporated communities in Noble County, Ohio